Halimi is a surname. Notable people with the surname include:

Alphonse Halimi (1932–2006), French boxer
Besar Halimi (born 1994), Kosovar footballer of Albanian descent 
Eduard Halimi, Albanian lawyer and politician
Gisèle Halimi (1927–2020), French-Tunisian lawyer, activist and writer
Ilami Halimi (born 1975), Macedonian footballer
Ilan Halimi (1982–2006), French murder victim
Lindita Halimi (born 1989), Albanian Kosovar singer, known by the mononym Lindita
Sarah Halimi (died 2017), French murder victim
Serge Halimi (born 1955), French journalist
Sidi Fredj Halimi (1876–1957), Algerian rabbi
Valérie Grumelin-Halimi (born 1961), French psychologist, psychotherapist and writer

Maghrebi Jewish surnames
Arabic-language surnames
Surnames of Moroccan origin
Surnames of Algerian origin